Charles Nelson Clark (August 21, 1827 – October 4, 1902) was a U.S. Representative from Missouri.

Born in Cortland County, New York, Clark attended Hamilton College, Clinton, New York.
He moved to Illinois in 1859.
When the Civil War broke out he assisted in raising a company of cavalry, which was made Company G, 3rd Illinois Cavalry Regiment, August 6, 1861, and went directly into service.
He became disabled and left the Army in 1863.
He settled in Hannibal, Missouri, in April 1865.
He became interested in the Mississippi River bottom lands in Illinois and undertook their reclamation.

Clark was elected as a Republican to the Fifty-fourth Congress (March 4, 1895 – March 3, 1897).
He engaged in agricultural pursuits.
He died in Hannibal, Missouri, October 4, 1902.
He was interred in Wauseon Cemetery, Wauseon, Ohio.

References

1827 births
1902 deaths
People from Cortland County, New York
Union Army personnel
People from Hannibal, Missouri
Republican Party members of the United States House of Representatives from Missouri
19th-century American politicians